Trechus pilosipennis is a species of ground beetle in the subfamily Trechinae. It was described by René Jeannel in 1954.

References

pilosipennis
Beetles described in 1954